In the mathematical field of graph theory, the Rado graph, Erdős–Rényi graph, or random graph is a countably infinite graph that can be constructed (with probability one) by choosing independently at random for each pair of its vertices whether to connect the vertices by an edge. The Rado graph can also be constructed non-randomly, by symmetrizing the membership relation of the hereditarily finite sets, by applying the BIT predicate to the binary representations of the natural numbers, or as an infinite Paley graph that has edges connecting pairs of prime numbers congruent to 1 mod 4 that are quadratic residues modulo each other.

Every finite or countably infinite graph is an induced subgraph of the Rado graph, and can be found as an induced subgraph by a greedy algorithm that builds up the subgraph one vertex at a time. The Rado graph is uniquely defined, among countable graphs, by an extension property that guarantees the correctness of this algorithm: no matter which vertices have already been chosen to form part of the induced subgraph, and no matter what pattern of adjacencies is needed to extend the subgraph by one more vertex, there will always exist another vertex with that pattern of adjacencies that the greedy algorithm can choose.

The Rado graph is highly symmetric: any isomorphism of its induced subgraphs can be extended to a symmetry of the whole graph.
The first-order logic sentences that are true of the Rado graph are also true of almost all random finite graphs, and the sentences that are false for the Rado graph are also false for almost all finite graphs. In model theory, the Rado graph forms an example of a saturated model of an ω-categorical and complete theory.

History
(Strictly speaking Ackermann described a directed graph, and the Rado graph is the corresponding undirected graph given by forgetting the directions on the edges.)  constructed the Rado graph as the random graph on a countable number of points. They proved that it has infinitely many automorphisms, and their argument also shows that it is unique though they did not mention this explicitly.  rediscovered the Rado graph as a universal graph, and gave an explicit construction of it with vertex set the natural numbers. Rado's construction is essentially equivalent to one of Ackermann's constructions.

Constructions

Binary numbers
 and  constructed the Rado graph using the BIT predicate as follows. They identified the vertices of the graph with the natural numbers 0, 1, 2, ...
Thus, for instance, the neighbors of vertex 0 consist of all odd-numbered vertices, because the numbers whose 0th bit is nonzero are exactly the odd numbers. Vertex 1 has one smaller neighbor, vertex 0, as 1 is odd and vertex 0 is connected to all odd vertices. The larger neighbors of vertex 1 are all vertices with numbers congruent to 2 or 3 modulo 4, because those are exactly the numbers with a nonzero bit at index 1.

Random graph
The Rado graph arises almost surely in the Erdős–Rényi model of a random graph on countably many vertices. Specifically, one may form an infinite graph by choosing, independently and with probability 1/2 for each pair of vertices, whether to connect the two vertices by an edge. With probability 1 the resulting graph is isomorphic to the Rado graph. This construction also works if any fixed probability  not equal to 0 or 1 is used in place of 1/2.

Repeatedly drawing a finite graph from the Erdős–Rényi model will in general lead to different graphs; however, when applied to a countably infinite graph, the model almost always produces the same infinite graph.

For any graph generated randomly in this way, the complement graph can be obtained at the same time by reversing all the choices: including an edge when the first graph did not include the same edge, and vice versa. This construction of the complement graph is an instance of the same process of choosing randomly and independently whether to include each edge, so it also (with probability 1) generates the Rado graph. Therefore, the Rado graph is a self-complementary graph.

Other constructions
In one of Ackermann's original 1937 constructions, the vertices of the Rado graph are indexed by the hereditarily finite sets, and there is an edge between two vertices exactly when one of the corresponding finite sets is a member of the other. A similar construction can be based on Skolem's paradox, the fact that there exists a countable model for the first-order theory of sets. One can construct the Rado graph from such a model by creating a vertex for each set, with an edge connecting each pair of sets where one set in the pair is a member of the other.

The Rado graph may also be formed by a construction resembling that for Paley graphs, taking as the vertices of a graph all the prime numbers that are congruent to 1 modulo 4, and connecting two vertices by an edge whenever one of the two numbers is a quadratic residue modulo the other. By quadratic reciprocity and the restriction of the vertices to primes congruent to 1 mod 4, this is a symmetric relation, so it defines an undirected graph, which turns out to be isomorphic to the Rado graph.

Another construction of the Rado graph shows that it is an infinite circulant graph, with the integers as its vertices and with an edge between each two integers whose distance (the absolute value of their difference) belongs to a particular set .

The Rado graph can also be constructed as the block intersection graph of an infinite block design in which the number of points and the size of each block are countably infinite. It can also be constructed as the Fraïssé limit of the class of finite graphs.

Properties

Extension

For instance, with the binary-number definition of the Rado graph, let

Because there are infinitely many vertices to choose from, each with the same finite probability of success, the probability is one that there exists a vertex that fulfils the extension property.

Induced subgraphs
The extension property can be used to build up isomorphic copies of any finite or countably infinite graph  within the Rado graph, as induced subgraphs.
At each step, the next vertex in  will be adjacent to some set  of vertices in  that are earlier in the ordering of the vertices,
Adding  to the partial copy of  produces a larger partial copy, with one more vertex.

This method forms the basis for a proof by induction, with the 0-vertex subgraph as its base case, that every finite or countably infinite graph is an induced subgraph of the Rado graph.

Uniqueness
The Rado graph is, up to graph isomorphism, the only countable graph with the extension property. Then, by applying the extension property twice, one can find isomorphic induced subgraphs  and  that include  and  together with all the vertices of the previous subgraphs. Thus, by the back-and-forth method,  and  must be isomorphic.
Because the graphs constructed by the random graph construction, binary number construction, and Paley graph construction are all countable graphs with the extension property, this argument shows that they are all isomorphic to each other.

Symmetry
Applying the back-and-forth construction to any two isomorphic finite subgraphs of the Rado graph extends their isomorphism to an automorphism of the entire Rado graph. The fact that every isomorphism of finite subgraphs extends to an automorphism of the whole graph is expressed by saying that the Rado graph is ultrahomogeneous. In particular, there is an automorphism taking any ordered pair of adjacent vertices to any other such ordered pair, so the Rado graph is a symmetric graph.

The automorphism group of the Rado graph is a simple group, whose number of elements is the cardinality of the continuum. Every subgroup of this group whose index is less than the cardinality of the continuum can be sandwiched between the pointwise stabilizer and the stabilizer of a finite set of vertices.

The construction of the Rado graph as an infinite circulant graph shows that its symmetry group includes automorphisms that generate a transitive infinite cyclic group. The difference set of this construction (the set of distances in the integers between adjacent vertices) can be constrained to include the difference 1, without affecting the correctness of this construction, from which it follows that the Rado graph contains an infinite Hamiltonian path whose symmetries are a subgroup of the symmetries of the whole graph.

Robustness against finite changes
If a graph  is formed from the Rado graph by deleting any finite number of edges or vertices, or adding a finite number of edges, the change does not affect the extension property of the graph. Therefore, any finite modification of this type results in a graph that is isomorphic to the Rado graph.

Partition
But then, the union of the sets  and the union of the sets  would form a set that could not be extended in the whole graph, contradicting the Rado graph's extension property. This property of being isomorphic to one of the induced subgraphs of any partition is held by only three countably infinite undirected graphs: the Rado graph, the complete graph, and the empty graph.  and  investigate infinite directed graphs with the same partition property; all are formed by choosing orientations for the edges of the complete graph or the Rado graph.

A related result concerns edge partitions instead of vertex partitions: for every partition of the edges of the Rado graph into finitely many sets, there is a subgraph isomorphic to the whole Rado graph that uses at most two of the colors. However, there may not necessarily exist an isomorphic subgraph that uses only one color of edges.

Model theory and 0-1 laws
 used the Rado graph to prove a zero–one law for first-order statements in the logic of graphs. When a logical statement of this type is true or false for the Rado graph, it is also true or false (respectively) for almost all finite graphs.

First-order properties
The first-order language of graphs is the collection of well-formed sentences in mathematical logic formed from variables representing the vertices of graphs, universal and existential quantifiers, logical connectives, and predicates for equality and adjacency of vertices. For instance, the condition that a graph does not have any isolated vertices may be expressed by the sentence

where the  symbol indicates the adjacency relation between two vertices.

For instance,  can be written as

Completeness
 proved that the sentences  , together with additional sentences stating that the adjacency relation is symmetric and antireflexive (that is, that a graph modeling these sentences is undirected and has no self-loops), are the axioms of a complete theory.
Because the Rado graph models the extension axioms, it models all sentences in this theory.

In logic, a theory that has only one model (up to isomorphism) with a given infinite cardinality  is called -categorical. The fact that the Rado graph is the unique countable graph with the extension property implies that it is also the unique countable model for its theory. This uniqueness property of the Rado graph can be expressed by saying that the theory of the Rado graph is ω-categorical. Łoś and Vaught proved in 1954 that when a theory is –categorical (for some infinite cardinal ) and, in addition, has no finite models, then the theory must be complete. Therefore, Gaifman's theorem that the theory of the Rado graph is complete follows from the uniqueness of the Rado graph by the Łoś–Vaught test.

Finite graphs and computational complexity
As  proved, the first-order sentences provable from the extension axioms and modeled by the Rado graph are exactly the sentences true for almost all random finite graphs. This means that if one chooses an -vertex graph uniformly at random among all graphs on  labeled vertices, then the probability that such a sentence will be true for the chosen graph approaches one in the limit as  approaches infinity. Symmetrically, the sentences that are not modeled by the Rado graph are false for almost all random finite graphs. It follows that every first-order sentence is either almost always true or almost always false for random finite graphs, and these two possibilities can be distinguished by determining whether the Rado graph models the sentence. Fagin's proof uses the compactness theorem. Based on this equivalence, the theory of sentences modeled by the Rado graph has been called "the theory of the random graph" or "the almost sure theory of graphs".

However, here, "large enough" is at least exponential in the size of the sentence.
It is unlikely that determining whether the Rado graph models a given sentence can be done more quickly than exponential time, as the problem is PSPACE-complete.

Saturated model
From the model theoretic point of view, the Rado graph is an example of a saturated model. This is just a logical formulation of the property that the Rado graph contains all finite graphs as induced subgraphs.

In this context, a type is a set of variables together with a collection of constraints on the values of some or all of the predicates determined by those variables; a complete type is a type that constrains all of the predicates determined by its variables. In the theory of graphs, the variables represent vertices and the predicates are the adjacencies between vertices, so a complete type specifies whether an edge is present or absent between every pair of vertices represented by the given variables. That is, a complete type specifies the subgraph that a particular set of vertex variables induces.

A saturated model is a model that realizes all of the types that have a number of variables at most equal to the cardinality of the model. The Rado graph has induced subgraphs of all finite or countably infinite types, so it is saturated.

Related concepts
Although the Rado graph is universal for induced subgraphs, it is not universal for isometric embeddings of graphs,
where an isometric embedding is a graph isomorphism which preserves distance. The Rado graph has diameter two, and so any graph with larger diameter does not embed isometrically into it.  has described a family of universal graphs for isometric embedding, one for each possible finite graph diameter; the graph in his family with diameter two is the Rado graph.

The Henson graphs are countable graphs (one for each positive integer ) that do not contain an -vertex clique, and are universal for -clique-free graphs. They can be constructed as induced subgraphs of the Rado graph. The Rado graph, the Henson graphs and their complements, disjoint unions of countably infinite cliques and their complements, and infinite disjoint unions of isomorphic finite cliques and their complements are the only possible countably infinite homogeneous graphs.

The universality property of the Rado graph can be extended to edge-colored graphs; that is, graphs in which the edges have been assigned to different color classes, but without the usual edge coloring requirement that each color class form a matching. For any finite or countably infinite number of colors , there exists a unique countably-infinite -edge-colored graph  such that every partial isomorphism of a -edge-colored finite graph can be extended to a full isomorphism. With this notation, the Rado graph is just .  investigates the automorphism groups of this more general family of graphs.

It follows from the classical model theory considerations of constructing a saturated model that under the continuum hypothesis CH, there is a universal graph with continuum many vertices. He also investigates analogous questions for higher cardinalities.

Notes

References

.
.
.
.
.
.
.
.
.
.
.

.
.
.
.
.
.
.
.
.
.
.
.
.
.

Individual graphs
Random graphs
Infinite graphs